Israel Castro Vélez, better known as Shorty Castro (January 28, 1928 – January 22, 2018) was a Puerto Rican comedian, actor, comedy writer, stage director, radio host, singer, dancer, composer and musician, with a career spanning over 60 years.

Early career

Castro was born in Mayagüez's in La Quinta barrio to Juan Castro Ayala and Victoria Vélez Cuevas, the second and oldest male child of twelve siblings.

He developed the skills necessary to become an entertainer: good singing voice, talent as a percussionist, and good timing for comedy. While working full-time as a messenger for the municipality of Mayagüez, Castro held odd jobs in numerous local orchestras, mostly as a singer and percussionist. These orchestras included William Manzano's and Carlos López's (for both, Mon Rivera had also been a singer and percussionist), Mingo and his Whoopee Kids; Charlie Miró y sus Pájaros Locos; and San Germán's Happy Hills' Orchestra.

One of these orchestras performed a gig at the Baños de Coamo, where producer Tommy Muñiz took notice of Castro's performance. After meeting him, Muñiz asked Castro to perform in La Taberna India, Muñiz's best rated television show, alongside Rafael Cortijo's band. Castro then returned to Mayagüez to prepare for his move to San Juan, which was supposed to occur on August 24, 1956. At a road stop in Quebradillas, however, Castro learned about the sudden death of Ramón Ortiz del Rivero (Diplo), Puerto Rico's most popular comedian at the time.

With the country in mourning, Castro was forced to return to Mayagüez and wait one week for his television debut, on August 31. He played congas and sang a few of Mon Rivera's plenas with the Cortijo band that day. He later became a stagehand (first) and musical bit player within the program. When his contracts ran out, Castro returned to singing, and made a second tour of New York with the Happy Hills' Orchestra.

Muñiz and other producers regularly staged shows with Puerto Rican talent at the Puerto Rico Theater near Spanish Harlem, in New York City. Asked to return to Puerto Rico by Muñiz, Castro left his orchestra and started playing regular comedy roles in Tommy Muñiz's productions such as "Hogar, Dulce Hogar" where he played Napoleoncito, the romantic interest of María Antonieta, a maid played by Carmen Belén Richardson. He later played a similar role, "Medio Metro", along Velda González's Azucena in "La Criada Malcriada", first on television, later on film. He and José Miguel Agrelot worked together in many comedy television programs and live appearances. Their professional relationship and friendship lasted over 40 years. Agrelot once joked about Castro: "we get along so well that I'll probably die in his birthday."

In the 1970s, he almost died in a car crash with his red Corvette. He hosted Máxima 940 am radio show "Shorty Castro a las 11", on weekday noons, together with long-time friend and fellow comedian Tito Negrón. After this show ended suddenly, Shorty stayed unemployed for a while until he started hosting "Shortyoganes", a new show in the same radio station and at the same daytime, along with his old friend Dr. Oswaldo Oganes. This show also ended quickly. He later hosted a third show, "Nuestras Raíces", again with Tito Negrón, on weekday mornings.

Family

Shorty had a son and a daughter, seven grandchildren and six great-grandchildren.

Original characters
Castro eventually became a major player in Muñiz's productions, developing comedic characters of his own. Among these were:

 Ángelo - a mischievous angel that played pranks on other angels that lived among the clouds in heaven, generally annoying Ángel Guardián, the head angel, played by Jacobo Morales. This character was a favorite of Benicio del Toro's, who claims to have mimicked it as a child.
 Armando Galán y Figura - a ladies' man, always on the prowl for female company and constantly acting the part
 Ramoneta Cienfuegos de la O - an old maid, constantly craving male companionship, in a way similar to José Miguel Agrelot's Pasión character
 Camellito - a clever drunkard, named for his prodigious consumption of alcohol, which resembled that of a camel drinking water
 El Conde de París - an enigmatic, silent character -nominally a count- dressed in 1870s garb and a top hat who acted physical comedy bits that were the complete opposite of what was logically expected: pulling a ladder from behind a painter who had to hang from a ceiling, for example. The character's name is a play on Castro's home neighborhood in Mayagüez, named after Paris, France. The character played its bits against a musical backdrop: Ennio Morricone's Muscoli di Velluto, an instrumental song written for the Italian film "I Malamondo". This European-themed character was a personal favorite of Raul Julia's, who would later dress similarly in the final scene of La Gran Fiesta, a Puerto Rican film.
 Don Bernabé - a brash millionaire, dressed in a white suit and Knudsen hat, who would buy out anything and anybody who would stand in his way.
 Don Celedonio - an old man who plays domino in the park with three other old men in the TV show "Los Kakukómicos". Celedonio always makes fun of the one of them which always arrives late, calling him "Quick Arrow" ("Flecha Veloz").
 Panchito Zapata y Correa - a short Mexican revolutionary soldier with a large sombrero and wide moustache.
 Cabo Alejo - a short policeman with a large baton.
 Policarpio - a short, skilled, quick handyman who goes by the nickname "Poli"; he is the boyfriend of a handmaid named Enriqueta in the TV show "Entrando por la cocina".
 El Otro Gemelo - one of a comic duo of singing twins called "Los Gemelos del Oeste", a parody of real life duo "Los Gemelos del Sur", in the TV show "Esto no tiene nombre". The other twin was Shorty's real life brother, David. They opened their act by dancing to the Jewish folk song "Hava Nagila", then told several jokes, and always ended their part fighting with each other.
 Teniente Tito - also called "Tenientito" (Little Lieutenant), a short, grouchy army officer.
 Rolo - a short look-alike of Shorty's friend, Cuban singer Rolando Laserie, who is always watching TV. After each news or ad he listens to, he asks his wife in a loud voice: "¿Oíste eso, Tita?" (Did you hear that, Tita?), as the real Rolando always did.

Original songs
Two of Castro's plenas are particularly better known. "Pa' los caborrojeños" is an ode to the people of Cabo Rojo, Puerto Rico, written to coincide with his stints as a singer and percussionist in one of the town's local orchestras, that of Roberto Ortiz. On the other hand, the novelty song "Por dos pulgadas" ("By two inches") was a sleeper hit for fellow comedian Juan Manuel Lebrón during Puerto Rico's 1997 Christmas season which became a #1 hit on the Billboard Latin Tropical Airplay chart.

Mayagüez' Parque del Litoral 

Puerto Rican Public Law 186 (2010) honored Castro by naming a newly constructed shoreline park in Mayagüez, the Parque del Litoral, after him.

References

1928 births
2018 deaths
Deaths from cancer in Florida
Puerto Rican comedians
Puerto Rican male actors
People from Mayagüez, Puerto Rico
20th-century Puerto Rican male actors